Bhutta may refer to:

People with the surname
 M. H. Bhutta (born 1955), Canadian businessperson
 Muhammad Umar Bhutta (born 1992), Pakistani field hockey player
 Peerzada Mian Shahzad Maqbool Bhutta (born 1982), Pakistani politician
 Naseer Ahmed Bhutta, Pakistani lawyer
 Saeed Bhutta (born Saeed Bhutta), Pakistani historian
 Zulfiqar Bhutta, Pakistani-born physician

Places
 Bhutta (Ludhiana East), a village in Punjab, India
 Bhutta Village, a fishing village in Karachi, Pakistan
 Bhutta College of Education, Ludhiana, Punjab, India
 Bhutta College of Engineering & Technology, Ludhiana, Punjab, India
 Kot Bhutta, a village in Punjab, Pakistan

See also 
 
 Bhutan
 Bhuttar, Nepal
 Bhutto (clan), a Muslim Rajput clan in Sindh, Pakistan